Prosser is a former settlement in Nevada County, California. It lay at an elevation of 5613 feet (1711 m).

References

Former populated places in California
Former settlements in Nevada County, California